L'Infini (in English Infinity) is a French literary collection and magazine, established in 1983 in Paris by Philippe Sollers as a follow up of the magazine Tel Quel. The magazine was first published by Éditions Denoël and later on by Éditions Gallimard.

The magazine has published work by French authors, including its founder, Philippe Sollers, Louis-Ferdinand Céline, Julia Kristeva, Marcelin Pleynet, and other notable French writers and young authors such as Marc-Edouard Nabe, Pierre Bourgeade, François Meyronnis, Yannick Haenel, Frédéric Berthet, David di Nota, Clément Rosset, Alexandre Duval-Stalla,  Chantal Thomas, Thomas A. Ravier, Cécile Guilbert, Bernard Sichère, Raphaël Denys, and Alessandro Mercuri. Others include Philip Roth and Milan Kundera.

References

External links
 
 WorldCat record

1983 establishments in France
Editorial collections
Éditions Gallimard books
French-language magazines
Literary magazines published in France
Magazines established in 1983
Magazines published in Paris